When the End Began (stylized in Braille as ⠱⠢ ⠮ ⠢⠙ ⠆⠛⠁⠝) is the third studio album by American metalcore band Silent Planet. The album was released on November 2, 2018, through UNFD and Solid State Records. It was co-produced by Will Putney and Spencer Keene. This is the first album to feature Mitchell Stark as the only guitarist.

Background and promotion
On June 15, 2018, the band released "Northern Fires (Guernica)", which revolves around the Spanish Civil War. On July 17, they unveiled another single titled "Vanity of Sleep", which revolves around modern consumer despair. On August 7, the band announced the album itself and the release date.

On August 17, the third single, "Share the Body", was available with a corresponding music video. On September 14, the group was streaming the fourth single "In Absence". On October 19, one month before the album release, the fifth and final single of the album ,"The New Eternity", came out. On August 18, 2019, the band released an additional song, "Shark Week", a B-side from this album's sessions.

Critical reception

Nao Lewandowski states, "When the End Began is nothing short of spectacular and fans would expect nothing less from the band that has forged such a unique path in the music industry."

Caleb Newton writes, "In short, their work on their newest record never falls flat or leaves holes." Ali Cooper describes, "Audibly inspired by the harsh realities of the world in 2018, When the End Began is a dominating and genuine interpretation of where metalcore should be now, on the SILENT PLANET."

Ed Ford says of the album, "every note, beat, lyric and vocal is thought through and blended with differing genres of Metal to create something individual and rather good." Kel Burch writes, "Atmospherically huge and creatively impressive, the album reinforces Silent Planet's lofty position of being a respected and innovative voice in metalcore."

Track listing

Notes
 All track titles are stylized in Braille.

Personnel
Credits adapted from AllMusic.

Silent Planet
 Garrett Russell – unclean vocals
 Mitchell Stark – guitars, additional production
 Thomas Freckleton – bass, keyboards, clean vocals
 Alex Camarena – drums

Additional musicians
 Annalee Althouse and Caroline Garlick – violin on track 14, "Depths III"
 Blair Cunningham – viola on track 14, "Depths III"
 Lia Criscuolo – cello on track 14, "Depths III"

Additional personnel
 Will Putney – production, engineering, mixing, mastering, composition
 Spencer Keene – production
 Brandon Ebel – executive production
 Randy Slaugh – additional production, editing, string arrangements, string engineering
 Daniel Braunstein – additional production
 Steve Seid – engineering
 Chad Chen – editing on track 14, "Depths III"
 Matthew Guglielmo – assistance
 Kevin Johnson – multi-media
 Adam Skatula – A&R
 Ryan Sanders – art direction, design

Charts

References

2018 albums
Silent Planet albums
Solid State Records albums